is the Japanese pronunciation of an early style of music and dance from the Tang Dynasty in China.  was introduced into Japanese culture from China no earlier than the 8th century, and is still performed as one style of the imperial court music called .
During the Nara period (710–794), music and dances continued to flow into the capital from many parts of Asia. The first, consisted of pieces of Chinese and Indian origin, while  included Manchurian, Korean, and many of the Japanese pieces. These two styles can be distinguished by their instrumentations.

See also

Korean court music

Bongaku

References

Further reading

External links
Early Japanese music

Gagaku
Tang dynasty